Jacob Joshua Falk (also Yaakov Yehoshua ben Tzvi Hirsch, or Yaakov Yehoshua Falk — see Note on the name "Joshua Falk") 1680 – January 16, 1756) was a Polish and German rabbi and Talmudist, known as the Pnei Yehoshua.

Biography
Falk was born in Cracow in 1680 and died on the 14th of Shevat in Offenbach am Main in 1756. On his mother's side he was a grandson of Rabbi Yehoshua Heschel b. Yosef of Cracow, the author of Maginne Shelomoh. While a youth he became examiner of the Hebrew teachers of Lemberg. In 1702 his first wife, Leah Landau, his child, Guitel, and his mother were killed through an explosion of gunpowder that wrecked the house in which they lived. Falk himself narrowly escaped death, and was trapped in the debris of the explosion for hours. He vowed that if he got out alive, he would write a Sefer. He was miraculously saved, and thereafter wrote the Pnei Yehoshua. He married a second wife, Toba, who bore him four sons and at least two daughters.

He was called to the rabbinate of Tarlow and Lisko, small Galician towns. In 1717 he replaced Rabbi Tzvi Ashkenazi in the chief rabbinate of Lemberg; and thence he was called to Berlin in 1731.

Having displeased Veitel-Heine Ephraim, one of the most influential leaders of the community, by rendering a judgment against him, he was compelled at the expiration of his term of office (1734) to resign. After having been for seven years rabbi of Metz he became chief rabbi of Frankfort-on-the-Main; but the unfavorable attitude of the local authorities toward the Jews, and the fact that the community was divided by controversies, made his position there very precarious.

Soon afterward, the quarrel between Rabbis Yaakov Emden and Yonatan Eybeschütz broke out. Falk strongly opposed Eybeschütz, and was ultimately compelled to leave Frankfurt in 1750, due to the strong support Eybeschütz had there. He wandered from town to town until he came to Worms, where he remained for some years. He was recalled to Frankfurt; but his enemies prevented him from preaching in the synagogue, and he left the city a second time.

Author of Pnei Yehoshua
Rabbi Yaakov Yehoshua was one of the greatest Talmudists of his time and his book of commentary and novellae on the Talmud, Pnei Yehoshua, is one of the classic works of the era of Acharonim. It remains an important book in the study of Talmud to this day.

He wrote Pnei Yehoshua in four parts. Two of them were published in Frankfurt am Main (1752); the third, with his Pesak bet-Din Chadash, at Fürth (1766); the fourth, which, in addition to Talmudic novellae, contains novellae on the Tur Choshen Mishpat and Likkutim, also in Fürth (1780). Falk mentions writing a commentary on the Pentateuch, but it was never published.

References

 

Rabbis from Kraków
Talmudists
1680 births
1756 deaths
18th-century German rabbis
Authors of works on the Talmud
Rabbis from Frankfurt
18th-century Polish–Lithuanian rabbis